Harry Winer (born May 4, 1947, in Detroit, Michigan, U.S.) is an American film and television director, producer, and screenwriter. In addition, he is an Associate Arts Professor in the Undergraduate Film and Television Department at New York University Tisch School of the Arts. Winer and his wife Shelley Hack are co-presidents of the production company Smash Media, which develops and produces content for motion pictures, television and new media.

Personal life
Winer is married to former actress Shelley Hack, with whom he has a daughter, Devon Rose (b. 1990).

Selected filmography 

 Hart to Hart (9 Episodes) (1981–1983)
 SpaceCamp (1986)
 Heartbeat (1 Episode) (1988)
 Taking Back My Life: The Nancy Ziegenmeyer Story (1992)
 Men Don't Tell (1993)
 House Arrest (1996)
 Jeremiah (1998)
 Lucky 7 (2003)
 Alias (2 Episodes) (2000–2001)
 Felicity (10 Episodes) (2000–2002)
 Veronica Mars (5 Episodes) (2004–2007)
 Invasion (Episode: "All God's Creatures") (2006)

References

External links
 
 
 

1947 births
American television directors
American television producers
American television writers
American male television writers
Living people
Writers from Detroit
Film directors from Michigan
Screenwriters from Michigan